Joseph Anthony Fatone Jr. (born January 28, 1977) is an American singer, dancer, actor, and television personality. He is best known as a member of the boyband NSYNC, in which he sang baritone. In 2007, he came in second place on the ABC reality show Dancing with the Stars. He was the host of the U.S. and Australian versions of The Singing Bee, which aired on NBC in the United States. Fatone was the announcer for the game show Family Feud from 2010 to 2015. Fatone has hosted on Food Network's Rewrapped, Live Well Network's My Family Recipe Rocks, The Price Is Right Live! at Bally's Las Vegas; and appeared as "Rabbit" on the first season of The Masked Singer in 2019.

Early life and education
Fatone was born in Brooklyn, New York City, the son of Joe and Phyllis Fatone. He has a brother, Steven, and a sister, Janine, and was raised at 2140 84th Street in the Bensonhurst neighborhood. His father had sung in a doo-wop group called the Orions. At 13, he moved with his family to Orlando, Florida, where he attended Dr. Phillips High School.

Career

NSYNC
After high school, Fatone played "Wolfie" in Beetlejuice's Rock and Roll Graveyard Revue at Universal Studios in Orlando. There, in the summer of 1995, he befriended fellow park performer Chris Kirkpatrick who recruited him as the fourth member of a new vocal group that included Justin Timberlake and JC Chasez. They were later joined by Lance Bass and the band NSYNC was formed. Fatone sang baritone with the band from their formation to 2002, when they went on an indefinite hiatus, during which time they sold more than seventy million records worldwide. He performed lead vocals on the single "Together Again" and the No Strings Attached album track "I Thought She Knew". While a member of NSYNC, Fatone co-starred with bandmate Bass in the 2001 romantic comedy film On the Line and guest-starred with the band on The Simpsons episode, New Kids on the Blecch.

On August 25, 2013, NSYNC regrouped for a one-off performance at the 2013 MTV Video Music Awards. They performed a medley of "Girlfriend" and "Bye Bye Bye"; after the performance Lance Bass said that the group had no plans for a reunion tour or new music. In April 2019 the band reunited without Timberlake for a one-off performance with Ariana Grande at the Coachella Valley Music and Arts Festival. NSYNC have long been subject to speculation of a reunion, to which Fatone has given the answer: "Never say never".

Acting
In 2002 Fatone played Cousin Angelo in the comedy film My Big Fat Greek Wedding, a role he reprised in the TV spin-off My Big Fat Greek Life and the 2016 sequel. In the same year he made his Broadway debut, playing the lead in Rent at the Nederlander Theatre in New York. He went on to act in the critically acclaimed movie The Cooler and had minor roles in the experimental film Red Riding Hood and Homie Spumoni, the latter alongside Jamie-Lynn Sigler. He returned to Broadway in 2004 in a revival of Little Shop Of Horrors and later appeared in productions of The Producers and 42nd Street in Pittsburgh and Rock of Ages at Bally's Las Vegas.

Fatone played himself in the kung fu skit "Enter the Fat One" in the first season of Robot Chicken, later making more appearances on the show including the first Star Wars episode. He also played himself in the Syfy film Jersey Shore Shark Attack, the TV series Return of the Mac and the Comedy Central feature Cursed Friends. Fatone has guest-starred in the Disney Channel series Hannah Montana, Imagination Movers and Kim Possible in addition to various other TV shows and horror films, including Inkubus (2011) and Dead 7 (2016).

Presenting

Fatone was the "ringmaster" for NBC's reality series Celebrity Circus in 2005. In 2007 he hosted NBC's The Singing Bee and the Australian version of the show on Nine Network. The same year he became a red carpet host for TV Guide along with Lisa Rinna. In 2009 Fatone co-hosted the live pre-show for TNA Wrestling's biggest annual pay-per-view event, TNA Bound for Glory, alongside Jeremy Borash.

From 2010 to 2015, Fatone served as the announcer for host Steve Harvey on the show Family Feud. In which time he hosted the Live Well Network series My Family Recipe Rocks, the Food Network cooking competition Rewrapped, the series Parents Just Don't Understand on the Hub Network 
and was a celebrity guest host of The Price Is Right Live! at Bally's Las Vegas. In January 2012, Fatone was one of eight celebrities participating in the Food Network reality series Rachael vs. Guy: Celebrity Cook-Off. Though eliminated in week six, he secured a $5,000 award for his charity, the Fatone Family Foundation.

In February 2014 Fatone made an appearance on the hidden camera show Impractical Jokers, standing in for show regular Brian Quinn, during a challenge. He made repeat appearances on the show as host or featured guest in a number of specials, including a 2017 episode based at his Orlando hot dog restaurant, Fat One's. Fatone is the permanent host of the spin-off series Impractical Jokers: After Party and he made a cameo in Impractical Jokers: The Movie in 2020.

Fatone portrayed "Rabbit" on season one of the singing competition show The Masked Singer, tying with Rumer Willis as "Lion" for fourth place overall. Currently he is presenter of the game show Common Knowledge, which premiered on January 14, 2019, on the Game Show Network. In 2021 he served as a panelist on the Irish talent show Last Singer Standing.

Dancing with the Stars
On February 1, 2007, the ABC television network announced that Fatone would participate in season 4 of the American version of Dancing with the Stars, which debuted March 19, 2007. He ended up placing second, losing the mirror ball to Apolo Anton Ohno and Julianne Hough. He competed with professional partner Kym Johnson. Fatone participated in the 15th season of Dancing with the Stars for a second chance to win a mirror ball trophy, again dancing with Kym Johnson. They were the second couple eliminated. He later returned in season 27 during Trio Week as a trio partner to John Schneider and Emma Slater.

In February 2013, Fatone appeared on Holland America Line's "Dancing with the Stars at Sea", aboard the MS Eurodam. He returned to Dancing with the Stars at Sea on Holland America Line's MS Nieuw Amsterdam in January 2014. He was paired with Lacey Schwimmer and appeared alongside Mark Ballas, Sabrina Bryan, and a dance ensemble. Unlike the TV show, this was not a competition and there were no eliminations.

Personal life
Fatone met his wife, Kelly Baldwin, while they were still in high school in 1993. After joining NSYNC two years later, their relationship was off-and-on.

It was a much speculated rumor that Fatone had briefly dated singer Pink in early 2000, to which Pink stated, "[Joey] took me to Friendly's as a casual date, not like a date-date. I just wanted ice cream. We were in the friend zone." The singer has stated that although they did technically go on a date, it was more platonic and that Fatone was "a total sweetheart."

After rekindling his romance with Baldwin, shortly after that same year, she became pregnant in the spring of 2000 with their first child, Briahna, who was born exactly a year after the release of NSYNC's hit sophomore album, No Strings Attached. They became engaged in the fall of 2002.

On September 9, 2004, Fatone married Baldwin at Oheka Castle on Long Island, New York, in a ceremony that was attended by all his NSYNC bandmates. Fatone and his wife have two daughters: Briahna Joely, born March 21, 2001, and a second daughter born January 2010. Fatone's best friend, Lance Bass, is their godfather.

Discography

NSYNC
NSYNC (1997)
No Strings Attached (2000)
Celebrity (2001)

Stage work
 Rent – Mark Cohen (2002)
 Little Shop of Horrors – Seymour Krelborn (2004)
 The Producers – Franz Liebkind (2010)
 42nd Street – Bert Barry (2013)
 Rock of Ages – The Palazzo, Las Vegas (2015)

Filmography

Film

Television

Music videos

Dancing with the Stars
Season 4:

Season 15:

References

External links

 
 
 Joey Fatone at TVGuide.com
 Exclusive Radio Interview

1977 births
Male actors from New York City
American male film actors
20th-century American singers
21st-century American singers
American game show hosts
American male musical theatre actors
American people of Italian descent
American baritones
American male pop singers
Contestants on American game shows
Game show announcers
Living people
Singers from New York (state)
NSYNC members
Musicians from Brooklyn
Singers from Orlando, Florida
Male actors from Orlando, Florida
Dr. Phillips High School alumni
Participants in American reality television series